The 2023 NCHC Tournament was the tenth tournament in league history. It was played between March 10 and 18, 2023. Quarterfinal games were be played at home team campus sites, while the final four matches were held at the Xcel Energy Center in Saint Paul, Minnesota. As the tournament winner, St. Cloud State earned the NCHC's automatic bid to the 2023 NCAA Division I men's ice hockey tournament.

Format
The first round of the postseason tournament featured a best-of-three games format. All eight conference teams participated in the tournament. Teams were seeded No. 1 through No. 8 according to their final conference standing, with a tiebreaker system used to seed teams with an identical number of points accumulated. The top four seeded teams each earn home ice and host one of the lower seeded teams.

The winners of the first round series advanced to the Xcel Energy Center for the NCHC Frozen Faceoff. The Frozen Faceoff used a single-elimination format. Teams were re-seeded No. 1 through No. 4 according to the final regular season conference standings.

Standings

Bracket
Teams are reseeded for the semifinals.

* denotes overtime periods

Results
All times are local.

Quarterfinals

(1) Denver vs. (8) Miami

(2) Western Michigan vs. (7) Colorado College

(3) Omaha vs. (6) North Dakota

(4) St. Cloud State vs. (5) Minnesota Duluth

Semifinals

(1) Denver vs. (7) Colorado College

(4) St. Cloud State vs. (6) North Dakota

Championship

(4) St. Cloud State vs. (7) Colorado College

Tournament awards

Frozen Faceoff All-Tournament Team
F: Jami Krannila* (St. Cloud State)
F: Zach Okabe (St. Cloud State)
F: Hunter McKown (Colorado College)
D: Bryan Yoon (Colorado College)
D: Jack Peart (St. Cloud State)
G: Jaxon Castor (St. Cloud State)
* Most Valuable Player(s)

References

NCHC Tournament
National Collegiate Hockey Conference Tournament
NCHC Tournament
NCHC Tournament
NCHC Tournament
NCHC Tournament